Lassaba tayulingensis is a moth in the family Geometridae. It is found in Taiwan.

References

Moths described in 1986
Boarmiini
Moths of Taiwan